Alone at Prom is the sixth studio album by Canadian rapper and singer Tory Lanez. It was released on December 10, 2021, through his independent label One Umbrella. The album is heavily inspired by '80s music, and it was developed  based on that era of music and aesthetics.

The album was supported by three singles: "Lady of Namek", "'87 Stingray" and "Enchanted Waterfall". The album's fourth track, "The Color Violet", became a sleeper hit after going viral on TikTok.

Background
The album was first announced through the rapper's Instagram account when he revealed that he was working on an "80s capsule" in late 2020, sharing snippets of the project during the last months of 2020 and throughout 2021. Alone at Prom was officially announced, along with its title, in September 2021. Lanez cited as musical inspirations for the project artists such as Hall & Oates, Toto, Michael Jackson and Rick James.

He explained its musical direction by saying, "The music was so retro and nostalgic that the character had to be created and authenticated through film, picture and music video."

Critical reception

Alone at Prom was met with critical acclaim upon release. Mason Kirby of Our Generation Music said, "Alone at Prom's remarkable retro approach not only intertwines harmoniously sung melodies with ethereal, electro-inspired production, but ascends Tory to a higher level than ever below."

Track listing

Sample credits
 "Enchanted Waterfall" contains an interpolation from Wham!'s 1984 song "Careless Whisper".
 "Pluto's Last Comet" contains an uncredited sample from Madonna's 1985 song "Into the Groove".
 "Last Kiss of Nebulon" contains a sample from Philip Bailey and Phil Collins's 1984 song "Easy Lover".

Charts

References

2021 albums
Tory Lanez albums